The Bay of Pontas is a bay, in the civil parish of Feteira, municipality of Angra do Heroísmo, in the Portuguese archipelago of the Azores. The waterbody is situated along the southern coast of the island of Terceira across from the  Cabras Islet.

Angra do Heroísmo
Bay Pontas
Pontas